PS Jembrana (formerly known as Persada Jembrana) is an Indonesian football club based in Negara, Jembrana Regency, Bali. They currently compete in the Liga 3.

Honours
 Liga 3 Bali
 Runners-up: 2021

References

Football clubs in Indonesia
Football clubs in Bali